Bob Richardson (born December 1, 1942, in Chicago, Illinois) is a film animator, director and producer. Also, writer/illustrator of books: "The Book Beetles in 'Who's Been Eating Our Books?" (2021) and "The Awesome Adventures of the Laboratory (Lab) Lizards" (2022)

Career
Richardson has seven Emmy Award nominations and has won five times for the following projects.
 Tutenstein - Outstanding Special Class Animated Program - 2004
 Muppet Babies - Outstanding Animated Program - 1985, 1986, 1987, 1988

Selected animated works

Film
The Jungle Book (1966) assistant animator
"Heavy Traffic" (1973) animator 
Pink Panther Theatrical Shorts (1975-1979) Animator
"Capricorn One" (1977) FX Animator
Ultimate Avengers: The Movie (2006)Producer and Supervising Director
"Ultimate Avengers II" (2006) Producer and Supervising Director

Television
My World And WelcomeTo It (1969-1970) (TV series) Animation Director
The Incredible, Indelible, Magical, Physical Mystery Trip (1973) animator
The Magical Mystery Trip Through Little Red's Head (1974) animator
Pontoffel Pock, Where Are You? (1980) animator
The Grinch Grinches the Cat in the Hat (1982) animator
Dr. Seuss On The Loose (1973) storyboard artist, animator
"Spider-Woman" (1979-1980) (TV Series) Director
"Dennis The Menace in Mayday For Mother" (1981) Director
"The Charmkins" (1983) Producer, Director
"Meatballs and Spaghetti" (1982) (TV Series) Producer, Director
"Dungeons & Dragons" (1983) (TV series) Producer and Director
"Rude Dog And The Dweebs" (1989) (TV series) Producer 
Jim Henson's Muppet Babies (1984-1990) (TV series) supervising producer, producer and animation director
"Cro" (1993-1994) (TV Series) Producer, Director
"Spider-Man: The Animated Series" (1994-1998) (TV Series) Supervising Producer and Director
"Max Steel" (2000-2002) (TV Series) Producer, Director
"Tutenstein" (2003-2005) (TV Series) Director

External links

Living people
Place of birth missing (living people)
American television directors
American film directors
American animated film directors
American animated film producers
American film producers
American television producers
American storyboard artists
1946 births